Incident in the Taiga (Russian: Случай в тайге) is a 1953 Soviet action film directed by Yuri Yegorov and starring Aleksandr Antonov and Gombozhap Tsydynzhapov.

Cast 
 Rimma Shorokhova as Yelena Sedykh (as R. Shorokhova)
 Boris Bityukov as Andrey Sazonov (as B. Bityukov)
 Aleksandr Antonov as Fyodor Volkov (as A. Antonov)
 Anatoliy Kubatsky as Nikita Stepanych (as A. Kubatskiy)
 Gombozhap Tsydynzhapov as Bogduyev (as G. Tsydynzhapov)
 Muza Krepkogorskaya as Katya Volkova (as M. Krepkogorskaya)
 Ivan Kuznetsov as Dolgushin (as I. Kuznetsov)
 Tsyren Shagzhin as Uladay (as Ts. Shagzin)
 Pyotr Lyubeshkin as Yegor Ivanovich (as P. Lyubeshkin)
 Vladimir Gulyaev as Yasha

References

Bibliography 
 Rollberg, Peter. Historical Dictionary of Russian and Soviet Cinema. Scarecrow Press, 2008.

External links 
 

1953 films
1950s action films
Soviet action films
1950s Russian-language films